Alkalihalobacillus okhensis is a strictly aerobic and rod-shaped bacterium from the genus of Alkalihalobacillus.

References

Bacillaceae
Bacteria described in 2006